Paprzycki is a surname of Polish origin. Notable people with the surname include:

Lech Krzysztof Paprzycki (1947–2022), Polish lawyer and politician
Oskar Paprzycki (born 1998), Polish footballer

Polish-language surnames